The Highwaterman catfish (Hypophthalmus edentatus), is a species of pelagic potamodromous catfish of the family Pimelodidae that is native to Guyana, Suriname, Venezuela, northern Brazil and Gulf of Paria.

Description
It grows to a length of 57.5 cm. It has no teeth but possesses many long gill rakers and three long barbels. Body elongated with less depressed head. Caudal fin triangular. Lateral line complete and scales absent on skin. Dorsum light grey with steely blue cast. Ventral sides yellowish and whitish below. Barbels light grey.

Distribution
It inhabits Amazon and Orinoco River basins and Atlantic coastal rivers of Guyana and Suriname. It is also found in Paraná River.

Ecology
It lives in soft muddy bottoms and are filter feeders. It feeds on crustaceans like debris, cladocerans, copepods and ostracods. Expected life span in aquarium is 16-17 years.

References

External links
 Age and growth of Hypophthalmus edentatus (Spix), (Siluriformes, Hypophthalmidae) in the Itaipu Reservoir, Paraná, Brazil

Pimelodidae
Catfish of South America
Fish described in 1829